George Mackenzie may refer to:

People
George Mackenzie of Rosehaugh (1636–1691), Scottish lawyer
George Mackenzie, 1st Earl of Cromartie (1630–1714), Scottish Secretary of State
George Mackenzie, 2nd Earl of Seaforth (died 1651), Highland clan chief and Scottish nobleman
George Mackenzie (died 1760) (c. 1662–1760), MP for Inverness Burghs, 1710–13
Sir George Mackenzie, 4th Baronet (c. 1702–1748), MP for Cromarty, 1729–34
George Mackenzie, 3rd Earl of Cromartie (c. 1703–1766), Scottish nobleman
George Mackenzie (1741–1787), army officer at Great Siege of Gibraltar
George Mackenzie (Royal Navy officer) (died 1780), British admiral
Sir George Mackenzie, 7th Baronet (1780–1848), Scottish mineralogist
George Henry Mackenzie (1837–1891), Scottish-American chess master
George MacKenzie (wrestler) (1890–1956), British champion wrestler
George K. MacKenzie (1910–1943), U.S. Navy officer
George P. MacKenzie (1873–1953), former administrator for the Canadian Yukon
George Sutherland Mackenzie (1844–1910), British businessman and explorer
George Mackenzie, a nickname of professional baseball player Kenji Johjima (born 1975)

Ships
USS George K. MacKenzie (DD-836), a Gearing-class destroyer of the United States Navy

Mackenzie, George